Lachine Hospital is a public hospital in Montreal, Quebec, Canada. It is located at 650 16th Avenue in the borough of Lachine (at the corner of Saint Antoine Street).

A community general hospital, it offers a range of services including ophthalmology, cardiology, general surgery, laboratory services and medical imaging (MRI, CT scan, Radiography, and Ultrasound).

The Lachine Hospital is currently involved in a major modernization project. The $220 million project is being developed in partnership with the Ministry of Health and Social Services (MHSS) and the Société québécoise des infrastructures (SQI).

History
Established in 1913 as the Hôpital St-Joseph, it was administered by the Sisters of Providence. In 1973, its name was changed to Centre hospitalier de Lachine and its management was transferred to the Government of Quebec.

The Lachine Hospital and its long-term nursing home (Camille-Lefebvre Pavillon) were integrated into the McGill University Health Centre in 2008.

References

External links
 Lachine Hospital | McGill University Health Centre

Hospitals in Montreal
Hospital buildings completed in 1935
Hospitals established in 1913
Lachine, Quebec
1913 establishments in Quebec
McGill University buildings